Doyle is a surname of Irish origin. The name is a back-formation from O'Doyle, which is an Anglicisation of the Irish , meaning "descendant of Dubhghall". There is another possible etymology: the Anglo-Norman surname D'Oyley with agglutination of the French article de (cf. Disney). It means 'from Ouilly', the name of a knight who originated from one of the places named Ouilly in Normandy, such as Ouilly-le-Tesson (Calvados, Oylley 1050), Ouilly-le-Vicomte (Calvados, de Oilleio 1279), etc. The relationship with the family D'Oyly is unknown.

The personal name Dubhghall contains the elements dubh "black" + gall "stranger". Similar Scottish and Irish surnames, derived from the same personal name are: MacDougall / McDougall and MacDowell / McDowell.

During the Viking Age the term Dubhghoill was used to describe the Vikings—usually Danes—and the term Fionnghoill ("fair foreigners") was used to describe Norwegians. There is uncertainty as to the exact meaning of these terms. If they do not refer to literal colours of hair, complexion, or apparel, the terms could denote "new" and "old" Vikings. If correct, the terms may distinguish different groups or dynasties, or perhaps represent ethnonyms referring to Danes and Norwegians respectively. Later, Fionnghall was used to describe Scottish Gaels from the Hebrides, and sometimes the Hiberno-Normans (or "Old English"). The most common term for the Hiberno-Normans was Seanghoill ("old foreigners") to differentiate themselves from the Dubhghoill the "new foreigners" or "dark foreigners" who came to Ireland during Tudor conquest of Ireland.

The name Doyle is not found in any of the old genealogies which document other prominent Irish families. This has led many to maintain that the Doyles are of somewhat recent origin in Ireland. In 2014, Doyle was the ninth most common surname in Ireland. In consequence it is thought that there may be several different specific sources of the name. Doyles found in Ulster may be of Scottish descent, as the name was used for MacDowell. In the 20th century the principal locations of the surname were in Dublin, Wexford, Wicklow, Carlow, Kerry and Cork.

A
A. E. Doyle (1877–1928), American architect
Abigail Doyle, Associate Professor of Chemistry at Princeton University
Adrian Conan Doyle (1910–1970), youngest son of Sir Arthur Conan Doyle
Al 'Do-it' Doyle, British electropop musician
Alan Doyle (born 1969), Canadian musician and actor
Allen Doyle (born 1948), American golfer
Andrew Doyle (disambiguation), several people
Anne Doyle (born 1952), Irish television newsreader
Arthur Conan Doyle (1859–1930), British writer
Avril Doyle (born 1949), former Irish politician

B
Brian Doyle (1930–2008), Australian rower
Brian Doyle (born 1935), Canadian writer
Brian Doyle (born 1955), former Major League Baseball player
Brian Doyle-Murray (born 1945), American actor and writer
Brian J. Doyle (born 1950), former Press secretary for the U.S. Department of Homeland Security

C
Candida Doyle (born 1963), Irish musician
Cartha Doyle (born 1929), All-American Girls Professional Baseball League player
Charles Altamont Doyle (1832–1893), Victorian artist
Charles Hastings Doyle (1804–1883), British military officer
Charley "Little Buddy" Doyle (1911–unknown), American country blues guitarist, singer and songwriter
Chris Doyle, American multi-media artist
Christopher Doyle (born 1952), Australian cinematographer
Clyde Doyle (1887–1963), U.S. Representative from California
Cóilín Ó Dubhghaill (born 1974), Irish silversmith and academic, co-inventor of mikana
Colin Doyle (born 1977), Canadian lacrosse player
Colin Doyle (born 1985), Irish footballer
Cornelius J. Doyle (1871–1938), American politician
Craig Doyle (born 1970), Irish television and radio presenter

D
Damhnait Doyle (born 1975), Canadian singer
Danny Doyle (1917–2004), American baseball player
Danny Doyle (singer) (1940–2019), Irish folk singer
David Doyle (1929–1997), American actor
David Doyle, Manx politician
David J. Doyle, Michigan politician
Debra Doyle (1952–2020), American writer
Denny Doyle (1944-2022), American baseball player
Denny Doyle (born 1949), politician in Oregon, United States
Denzil Doyle, Canadian entrepreneur
Desmond Doyle (1924–1986), Irish painter
Doyle Wolfgang von Frankenstein, American songwriter and guitarist

E
Eamon Doyle (born 1983), American R&B singer
Ed Doyle (politician) (born 1935), former Canadian politician
Eddie Doyle (American football) (1898–1942), American football player
Eddie Doyle (hurler) (1897–1948), Irish hurler
Edward Doyle (Irish politician), Irish Labour Party politician
Eoin Doyle, Irish footballer
Eugene C. Doyle (1925–1989), American politician

F
Francis Hastings Doyle (1810–1888), British poet
Frank Doyle (ice hockey) (born 1980), Canadian ice hockey player
Frank Doyle (politician) (1922–1984), Australian politician
Frank Doyle (writer) (1917–1996), American comic writer

G
Gary Doyle, (born 1949), former Canadian ice hockey player
George Doyle, Gaelic footballer
Geraldine Doyle (1924–2010), American model.
Gerry Doyle (disambiguation), several people
Glennon Doyle (born 1976), American writer
Graham Doyle (born 1974), Irish football coach

H
Harry Doyle (politician) (born 1941), former Canadian politician
Hollie Doyle, British jockey

J
Jacob Doyle (1855–1941), Major League Baseball player
James Doyle (disambiguation), several people
Jean Conan Doyle (1912–1997), daughter of Arthur Conan Doyle
Jeff Doyle (born 1956), former Major League Baseball player
Jerry Doyle (1956–2016), American talk radio host
Jerry Doyle, former Canadian politician
Joanne Doyle (born 1973), Irish dancer with Riverdance
Joe Doyle (cyclist), Irish racing cyclist and administrator
Joe Doyle (musician) (born 1977), Irish rock bassist
Joe Doyle (politician) (1936–2009), Fine Gael politician, Lord Mayor of Dublin
John Doyle (disambiguation), several people
John Paul "JP" Doyle (born 1979), Irish rugby union referee based in England
Joseph "Jack" Doyle, (1913–1978), Irish boxer, actor and tenor
Josh Doyle, solo rock artist

K
Kathleen Doyle (born 1998), American basketball player
Keith Doyle (footballer) (born 1979), Irish football player
Keith Doyle (politician) (born 1924), Australian politician
Kevin Doyle (born 1983), Irish footballer
Kevin Doyle (actor) (born 1961), British actor
Kirby Doyle (1932–2003), American poet
Kristy Doyle (born 1980), Australian netball player

L
Larry Doyle (1886–1974), Major League Baseball player
Larry Doyle (born 1958), American writer
Laurance Doyle (born 1953), American scientist
Linda Doyle (born 1968), Irish engineer, professor and university head
Little Buddy Doyle (1911–c.1960), American blues guitarist, singer and songwriter
Loretta Doyle (born 1963), British judoka

M
Maria Doyle Kennedy (born 1964), Irish actress and singer
Martin Doyle (disambiguation), several people
Mary Doyle (1931–1995), American actress
Melissa Doyle (born 1970), Australian TV journalist
Michael Doyle (disambiguation), several people

N
Nathan Doyle (born 1987), English footballer
Nicholas Grattan-Doyle (1862–1941), British Conservative Party politician
Norman Doyle (born 1945), former Canadian politician

P
Paddy Doyle, British athlete
Paddy Doyle (1941–2020), Irish hurler
Patrick Doyle (1777–1857), Canadian businessman
Patrick Doyle (born 1953), Scottish composer
Paul Doyle (born 1939),  retired Major League Baseball player
Percy William Doyle (1806?–1887), British diplomat
Peter Doyle (1844–1900), American politician
Peter Doyle (born 1945), Irish cyclist
Peter Doyle (1949–2001), Australian pop singer
Peter Doyle (born 1951), Australian writer
Peter John Haworth Doyle (born 1944), Roman Catholic Bishop of Northampton
Phil Doyle (born 1967), Australian writer

R 
Richard Doyle (illustrator) (1824–1883), Victorian illustrator
Richard Doyle (senator) (1923–2003), Canadian senator (1985–1998)
Robert Doyle (born 1953), Australian politician
Robert B. Doyle, Manitoba judge
Roddy Doyle (born 1958), Irish writer
Roger Doyle (born 1949), Irish composer
Ruth Bachhuber Doyle (1916–2006), Wisconsin politician
Ryan Doyle (born 1991), model, Sinead Doyle's husband
Ryan Doyle (boxer) (born 1991), British boxer

S
Sam Doyle (1908–1985), American folk artist
Simon Doyle (born 1966), former Australian middle-distance runner
Slow Joe Doyle (1881–1947), Major League Baseball player
Stephen Doyle (footballer) (born 1981), South Australian Australian rules footballer
Stephen Doyle (hurler), Irish hurler
Steve Doyle, Welsh footballer
Steve Doyle (Wisconsin politician), American politician
Steven Doyle, chess tournament organiser
Susannah Doyle (born 1966), British actress and film director

T
Thomas Doyle (disambiguation), multiple people
Tim Doyle (born 1959), American sitcom writer and producer
Tomás Ó Dubhghaill (1917–1962), Irish Republican Army and Sinn Féin activist, president of Sinn Féin in the 1950s
Tony Doyle (actor) (1942–2000), Irish actor
Tony Doyle (cyclist) (born 1958), former British track cyclist

W
William Doyle (businessman), CEO of the Potash Corporation of Saskatchewan
William Doyle (historian) (born 1942), British historian
William Edward Doyle (1911–1986), United States federal judge
William T. Doyle (born 1926), American politician
Willie Doyle (1873–1917), Irish Jesuit priest

Y 

Yvonne Doyle (physician) (born 1957), Irish medical director in England
Yvonne Doyle (tennis) (born 1974), Irish professional tennis player

Fictional characters
Allen Francis Doyle, in the television series Angel
 Prof. Conner Doyle, in the television series Psi Factor: Chronicles of the Paranormal
Ian Doyle, IRA terrorist in the television series Criminal Minds
 Captain Jack Doyle, played by Morgan Freeman in the movie Gone Baby Gone
 Jake, Malachy and Tinny Doyle, in the CBC television series Republic of Doyle
Sgt. James Doyle, in Call of Duty: United Offensive
Jimmy "Popeye" Doyle, detective played by Gene Hackman in The French Connection
 Kenny Doyle, in the film Death Note
 Kevin Doyle, also known as Malcolm Doyle, played by James Marsden in the movie 27 Dresses
Maggie Doyle, in the television show Blue Heelers
Mike Doyle, in the television series 24
Mrs Doyle, in the television series Father Ted
Ray Doyle, in the TV series The Professionals.
Roz Doyle, in the comedy series Frasier
Corporal Seamus Doyle, Brothers in Arms character
 Sebastian Doyle, an alter-ego of the character Dave Lister in the Red Dwarf episode "Back to Reality"
Yvonne Doyle (Fair City), in the Irish soap opera Fair City
 Capt. Doyle, the character who took the place of Nikolai from the mobile phone version of Call of Duty 4: Modern Warfare
 Detective Doyle, Lt. Kellaway's sidekick from The Mask
 Doyle, androidian character in the television series Andromeda

References

External links 
 The Doyle Clan
 History of the Doyle surname in Ireland, including Doyle clan history, famous people, homelands and guestbook.

English-language surnames
Anglicised Irish-language surnames